Earle is a city in Crittenden County, Arkansas, United States. Per the 2020 census, the population was 1,831.

Geography
Earle is located in western Crittenden County at  (35.270405, -90.464841). U.S. Route 64 passes through the northern part of the city, bypassing the downtown area.

History

In 1918, an African-American man named Elton Mitchell was eviscerated with a knife and hanged from a tree after he refused to work for a white landowner for free.

In 1928, the widow and family of local figure George Berry Washington had a monument (known as "the Angel in the Field") built to honor Washington's life. Born into slavery in 1864, Washington established a thriving business as a landlord, and through this enterprise provided a means of income for hundreds of Black Arkansans. 

The 2022 Earle mayoral election resulted in a historic victory for Jaylen Smith, who at 18 years old became the youngest Black person to be elected mayor in any U.S. town.

Demographics

2020 census

Note: the US Census treats Hispanic/Latino as an ethnic category. This table excludes Latinos from the racial categories and assigns them to a separate category. Hispanics/Latinos can be of any race.

2000 census
As of the census of 2000, there were 3,036 people, 1,074 households, and 727 families living in the city. The racial makeup of the city was 23.45% White, 75.23% Black or African American, 0.20% Native American, 0.43% Asian, 0.10% from other races, and 0.59% from two or more races.  0.53% of the population were Hispanic or Latino of any race.

There were 1,074 households, out of which 36.1% had children under the age of 18 living with them, 35.0% were married couples living together, 27.7% had a female householder with no husband present, and 32.3% were non-families. 29.7% of all households were made up of individuals, and 13.5% had someone living alone who was 65 years of age or older.  The average household size was 2.83 and the average family size was 3.54.

In the city, the population was spread out, with 36.6% under the age of 18, 9.4% from 18 to 24, 24.0% from 25 to 44, 17.0% from 45 to 64, and 13.0% who were 65 years of age or older.  The median age was 29 years. For every 100 females, there were 82.6 males.  For every 100 females age 18 and over, there were 74.6 males.

The median income for a household in the city was $20,344, and the median income for a family was $22,775. Males had a median income of $26,510 versus $18,011 for females. The per capita income for the city was $13,260.  About 40.2% of families and 45.4% of the population were below the poverty line, including 58.7% of those under age 18 and 36.6% of those age 65 or over.

Education 
Public education for early childhood, elementary and secondary school students is primarily provided by the Earle School District, which leads to graduation from Earle High School.  The Old Earle High School with its Mission/Spanish Revival style served as the city's high school from 1919 to 1978 and is listed on the National Register of Historic Places.

May 2, 2008 tornado

On May 2, 2008, WMC-TV reported that a tornado which was reported to be large and very dangerous affected the Earle area causing major damage in parts of the town and some injuries. There were also reports of people missing or unaccounted for. Homes were reportedly destroyed, while businesses and the high school were also damaged. The tornado was later confirmed on the same day as an EF3 on the Enhanced Fujita Scale with winds near 150 to 160 mph.

Notable people

Charles T. Bernard (1927 – 2015), businessman and Republican politician
Carroll Cloar (1913 – 1993), surrealist painter and Guggenheim Fellowship recipient.
Shakey Jake Harris (1921 – 1990), Chicago blues singer, harmonicist and songwriter
George Berry Washington (1864 – 1928), a former slave who became one of Crittenden County's largest landowners
Wilson Douglas Watson (1922 – 1994), recipient of the Congressional Medal of Honor for actions on Iwo Jima
Jaylen Smith (born 2004), Mayor of Earle, youngest Black Mayor in the US and one of the youngest US mayors of any race.

References

Cities in Crittenden County, Arkansas
Cities in the Memphis metropolitan area
Cities in Arkansas